In a Chamber is the first studio album by the rock band Wire Train. The album contains the band's first single, "Chamber Of Hellos," released in late 1983, and the album was released in early 1984, on San Francisco-based 415 Records/Columbia Records.

Track listing
All songs written by Kevin Hunter & Kurt Herr.
"I'll Do You"
"Everything's Turning Up Down Again"
"Never"
"Like"
"I Forget It All (When I See You)"
"Chamber of Hellos"
"Slow Down"
"She's on Fire"
"I Gotta Go"
"Love Against Me"

Personnel
 Anders Rundblad - bass guitar, vocals
 Federico Gil-Sola - drums
 Kevin Hunter - vocals, guitar
 Kurt Herr - vocals, guitar

References

1984 debut albums
Albums produced by David Kahne
415 Records albums
Wire Train albums